A coin collector is different from a numismatist, which is someone who studies coins. Many collectors are also numismatists, but some are not. Likewise, not all numismatists collect coins themselves.

 Andreas Alföldi 
 Martin Allen
 Michel Amandry
 Augusto Carlos Teixeira de Aragão
 Simone Assemani
 Churchill Babington
 Georges Bataille
 Anselmo Banduri
 Jacob de Bie
 Carmen Arnold Biucchi
 Mark Blackburn 
 Osmund Bopearachchi
 Bartolomeo Borghesi
 Claude Gros de Boze
 Guillaume Budé
 Andrew Burnett
 Francesco Carelli
 Celestino Cavedoni
 Henry Cohen
 Joe Cribb
 Elena Abramovna Davidovich
 Borka Dragojević-Josifovska
 Théophile Marion Dumersan
 Stephan Ladislaus Endlicher
 Giuseppe Fiorelli
 Martin Folkes
 Suzanne Frey-Kupper
 Julius Friedländer
 Andrea Fulvio
 Raffaele Garrucci
 Shpresa Gjongecaj
 Francesco Gnecchi
 Philip Grierson
 P. L. Gupta
 Nicola Francesco Haym 
 Stefan Heidemann
 David Hendin
 G. Kenneth Jenkins
 Dorota Malarczyk
 Joel L. Malter
 Harold Mattingly
 Dorothea Menadier
 Michael Metcalf
 Maria Millington Lathbury
 Theodor Mommsen
 Zdenka Nemeškalová-Jiroudková
 Emanuela Nohejlová-Prátová
 Rosa Norström
 Joaquín Rubio y Muñoz
 Carlo Ottavio, Count Castiglione
 Elizabeth Pirie
 Adolf von Rauch (born 1805)
 Louis Robert
 Desiré-Raoul Rochette
 Eduard Rüppell
 Antonio Salinas
 Edith Schönert-Geiß
 Camillo Serafini
 Adolf Soetbeer
 Dmitry Sontsov
 Frederic Soret
 Johann Gustav Stickel
 Laura Sumner (numismatist)
 Charles Surasky
 Francois Thierry
 Olaus Gerhard Tychsen
 Bernhard Karl von Koehne
 Dorothy B. Waage
 Jörgen Zoega

See also
List of coin collectors

References